Cule, Kuli or Rumiwain is a mountain located on the boundary of the regions of Huanuco and Lima in Peru. It belongs to the Raura mountain range which is part of the Peruvian Andes.

References 

Mountains of Peru
Mountains of Huánuco Region
Mountains of Lima Region